Cheswill Johnson (born 30 September 1997) is a South African athlete who predominantly competes in the long jump.

He is a logistics/supply chain student at the University of Johannesburg. Johnson jumped 8.20 in Johannesburg on 1 February 2020, which was the 9th longest senior outdoor long jump in the world in 2020.

Johnson qualified for the delayed 2020 Tokyo Olympic Games when he leapt to 8.27m at the Athletics Gauteng North Bestmed Tuks Track and Field meeting in Pretoria on February 27, 2021. When he made the jump it was the leading jump in the world that year. Johnson  joins fellow long-jumpers, African champion Ruswahl Samaai and Zarck Visser, in the South Africa Olympic squad.

References

External links
 

Living people
1997 births
South African male long jumpers
South African male sprinters
Competitors at the 2017 Summer Universiade
Competitors at the 2019 Summer Universiade
Athletes (track and field) at the 2020 Summer Olympics
Olympic athletes of South Africa
20th-century South African people
21st-century South African people